Coburn is an unincorporated community in Wetzel County, West Virginia, United States. It lies at an elevation of 978 feet (298 m).

Coburn bears the name of an early settler.

References

Unincorporated communities in Wetzel County, West Virginia
Unincorporated communities in West Virginia